Anirudh Singh may refer to:
 Anirudh Singh (activist), Fijian scientist and social critic
 Anirudh Singh (politician) (born 1977), member of the Himachal Pradesh Legislative Assembly
 Anirudh Singh (cricketer) (born 1980), Indian cricketer

See also
 Aniruddh Singh, Indian television actor